Sturluson is a patronymic surname. Notable people with the patronymic include:

Kjartan Sturluson (born 1975), Icelandic footballer
Örlygur Sturluson (1981–2000), Icelandic basketball player
Sighvatr Sturluson (1170–1238), skaldic poet, goði and member of the Icelandic Sturlungar clan
Snorri Sturluson (1179–1241), Icelandic historian, poet, and politician

Patronymics

fi:Sturluson